Tolga Geçim (born March 27, 1996) is a Turkish professional basketball player for Tofaş of Basketbol Süper Ligi (BSL). He mainly plays the small forward position, but he also has the ability to play as a point guard and power forward if needed.

Professional career

Early years
Geçim was born in Adana. He started playing basketball with Adana Çınarlıspor. He moved to the Banvit junior team in 2008.

Banvit
In early years, he played for the junior, star and youth teams of Banvit. He was loaned for the 2012–13 and 2013–14 season to TB2L team Bandırma Kırmızı which is the pilot club of Banvit. In the summer of 2014, Geçim moved to Banvit first team.

Anadolu Efes
On June 24, 2019, he has signed 2 years contract with Turkish giants Anadolu Efes.

Frutti Extra Bursaspor
On January 7, 2022, he has signed with Frutti Extra Bursaspor of the Turkish Basketbol Süper Ligi (BSL).

Tofaş
On November 21, 2022, he signed with Tofaş of Basketbol Süper Ligi (BSL).

References

External links
 Tolga Geçim at draftexpress.com
 Tolga Geçim at eurobasket.com
 Tolga Gecim at FIBA
 Tolga Geçim at tblstat.net

 

1996 births
Living people
Anadolu Efes S.K. players
Bandırma B.İ.K. players
Bursaspor Basketbol players
Shooting guards
Small forwards
Sportspeople from Adana
Tofaş S.K. players
Turkish men's basketball players